Kinga of Poland (also known as Cunegunda;) (5 March 1224– 24 July 1292) is a saint in the Catholic Church and patroness of Poland and Lithuania.

Biography
She was born in Esztergom, Kingdom of Hungary, the daughter of King Béla IV of Hungary and Maria Laskarina. She was a niece of Elizabeth of Hungary and great-niece of Hedwig of Andechs. Kinga's sisters were Margaret of Hungary and Jolenta of Poland. She reluctantly married Bolesław V ("the Chaste") and became princess when her husband ascended the throne as High Duke of Poland. Despite the marriage, the devout couple took up a vow of chastity. The marriage was largely arranged by, and the vow of chastity patterned after that of Bolesław's sister, Salomea of Poland.

During her reign Kinga got involved in charitable works such as visiting the poor and helping the lepers. When her husband died in 1279, she sold all her material possessions and gave the money to the poor. She soon did not want any part in governing the kingdom which was left to her, and decided to become a Poor Clare nun in the monastery at Sandec (Stary Sącz). She would spend the rest of her life in contemplative prayer and did not allow anyone to refer to her past role as Grand Duchess of Poland. She died on 24 July 1292, aged 58.

Veneration

Pope Alexander VIII beatified Kinga in 1690. In 1695, she was made chief patroness of Poland and Lithuania. On 16 June 1999, she was canonized by Pope John Paul II.

Legend
Legend has it that Kinga threw her engagement ring into the Aknaszlatina salt mine in what was then Hungary. The ring miraculously traveled along with salt deposits to Wieliczka, where it was rediscovered. On this spot the miners erected a statue of Saint Kinga, carved entirely from salt, which is 101 meters under the Earth's surface.

Sources

External links

1224 births
1292 deaths
13th-century Hungarian people
13th-century German nuns
Beatified and canonised Árpádians
Piast dynasty
Hungarian princesses
Polish queens consort
Roman Catholic
13th-century Christian saints
Medieval Hungarian saints
Polish Roman Catholic saints
Hungarian Roman Catholic religious sisters and nuns
Hungarian people of Greek descent
Polish people of Hungarian descent
Polish people of Greek descent
People from Esztergom
Poor Clare abbesses
Franciscan saints
Roman Catholic royal saints
Christian female saints of the Middle Ages
Venerated Catholics by Pope John Paul II
13th-century Hungarian women
Canonizations by Pope John Paul II
Beatifications by Pope Alexander VIII
Daughters of kings